Robert F. Spencer (born 5 September 1957) is an Australian rock guitarist. He was a latter day member of Skyhooks (1977–1980) and the Angels (1986–1992). Spencer joined Rose Tattoo in 2017. As a songwriter he co-wrote tracks for the Angels, including sole writer for their single "Finger on the Trigger" (1988), which reached the ARIA Singles Chart top 40.

Biography 

Robert F. Spencer, grew up in Sydney's south-eastern suburb, Maroubra and attended Our Lady of Annunciation Primary School, at Pagewood, New South Wales from 1963 to 1965 and Marist Brothers, at Daceyville from 1966 to 1969. He performed for an hour at his primary school graduation concert in 1969. In 1970 he started secondary education at Marist Brothers Pagewood (later named Marist College, and then called Champagnat Catholic College Pagewood). He was a founding member of the rock band Finch in 1973 while attending Marist Brothers Pagewood, where he completed his Higher School Certificate in 1975.

He left Finch in 1977 to replace Red Symons on guitar in Skyhooks. He left that group in 1980. In 1986 he joined the Angels on guitar to replace John Brewster. He remained with the band until 1992. While a member of the Angels, he was also a co-songwriter of their material including sole writer for their single, "Finger on the Trigger" (1988). It peaked in the ARIA Singles Chart top 40.

Other bands in which he played were Mystery Band (1980–82), Fandango (1981), Honeymoon, Young Lions (both in 1984), Black Cat Moan (1989–90), the Puppy Bashers (1991), the Temple Gods (1992–93) and the Choirboys (1996).

He lived in Melbourne and was active in the band Raw Brit playing covers from the 1960s and 1970s, originally made famous by English rock bands, Cream, Free, Deep Purple and Slade. He is also a coach for professional bands and helps mature amateurs as part of the Weekend Warriors programme.

In August 2013, Spencer revealed on his Facebook page that he had been diagnosed with cancer, but confirmed that it was not life-threatening.

Bob Spencer has been a guitarist in the hard rock band, Rose Tattoo, since 2017, and recently retired from the band in September 2022 after the recently completed European tour

External links

 Website
 Bob Spencer Fan Group - Facebook

References

Australian rock guitarists
The Angels (Australian band) members
1957 births
Living people
Musicians from Sydney
Lead guitarists
Rose Tattoo members